Daniel Willman (born 18 March 1975) is a New Zealand former professional tennis player.

Willman played collegiate tennis for the University of Idaho from 1995 to 1998.

On the professional tour, Willman reached a best singles world ranking of 285. He received a wildcard into the main draw of the 2002 Heineken Open and featured in the qualifying draw for the 2003 Australian Open.

Willman competed for the New Zealand Davis Cup team in two ties in 2002, which included a doubles rubber against India's Mahesh Bhupathi and Leander Paes.

Since retiring he has worked as a tennis coach and co founded sports apparel company Athletic DNA.

ITF Futures titles

Singles: (1)

Doubles: (2)

See also
List of New Zealand Davis Cup team representatives

References

External links
 
 
 

1975 births
Living people
New Zealand male tennis players
Idaho Vandals athletes
College men's tennis players in the United States